India competed at the 2011 World Aquatics Championships in Shanghai, China between July 16 and 31, 2011.

Open water swimming

Men

Swimming

India qualified 3 swimmers.

Men

References

Nations at the 2011 World Aquatics Championships
2011 in Indian sport
India at the World Aquatics Championships